Peter Lilienthal (born 27 November 1929) is a German film director, writer, actor and producer. His 1979 film David won the Golden Bear at the 29th Berlin International Film Festival. His 1984 film Das Autogramm was entered into the 34th Berlin International Film Festival. In 1996, he was a member of the jury at the 46th Berlin International Film Festival.

Filmography

Director
1958: Studie 23 (co-directors: Pit Kroke, Jörg Müller, Ralph Wünsche), short
1959: Ausflug mit Damen (co-director Wolfgang Spier — Based on a play by Friedrich Michael)
1960: Die Nachbarskinder (segment of the anthology film Der Nachbar, screenplay: Benno Meyer-Wehlack), short
1961: Biographie eines Schokoladentages (screenplay: Dieter Gasper)
1962: Der 18. Geburtstag (screenplay: Theodor Kotulla, Klaus Roehler)
1962: Stück für Stück (screenplay: Benno Meyer-Wehlack)
1962: Picknick im Felde (screenplay: Peter Lilienthal — Based on a play by Fernando Arrabal), short
1963: Striptease (based on a play by Sławomir Mrożek), short
1963: Schule der Geläufigkeit (screenplay: Dieter Gasper), short
1964: Das Martyrium des Peter O'Hey (screenplay: Günther Kieser, Peter Lilienthal — Based on a play by Sławomir Mrożek)
1965: Guernica – Jede Stunde verletzt und die letzte tötet (based on a play by Fernando Arrabal), short
1965: Seraphine oder Die wundersame Geschichte der Tante Flora (screenplay: Peter Lilienthal — Based on a play by David Perry), short
1966: Abschied (screenplay: Günter Herburger)
1966: Der Beginn (screenplay: Günter Herburger, Peter Lilienthal)
1967: Unbeschriebenes Blatt (screenplay: Peter Lilienthal — Based on a play by Rhys Adrian)
1967: Abgründe (screenplay: Peter Schneider, George Moorse, Peter Lilienthal — Anthology film based on stories by Stanley Ellin and Patrick Quentin)
1967: Verbrechen mit Vorbedacht (screenplay: Piers Paul Read, Peter Lilienthal — Based on a story by Witold Gombrowicz)
1968: Tramp oder Der einzige und unvergleichliche Lenny Jacobson (screenplay: Peter Lilienthal — Based on a play by Barry Bermange)
1969: Horror (screenplay: Peter Lilienthal — Based on a novel by Henry Farrell)
1970: Malatesta (screenplay: Heathcote Williams, Michael Koser, Peter Lilienthal)
1971: Die Sonne angreifen (screenplay: Robert Muller, Peter Lilienthal — Based on a novel by Witold Gombrowicz)
1971: Jakob von Gunten (screenplay: Ror Wolf, Peter Lilienthal — Based on the novel Jakob von Gunten by Robert Walser)
1973: La Victoria (screenplay: Antonio Skármeta, Peter Lilienthal)
1975: Schoolmaster Hofer (screenplay: , Peter Lilienthal — Based on Hauptlehrer Hofer by Günter Herburger)
1975:  (screenplay: Antonio Skármeta, Peter Lilienthal)
1979: David (screenplay: Jurek Becker, Peter Lilienthal — Based on Den Netzen entronnen by Joel König)
1980:  (screenplay: Antonio Skármeta, Peter Lilienthal)
1982: Dear Mr. Wonderful (screenplay: Sam Koperwas)
1984: Das Autogramm (screenplay: Peter Lilienthal — Based on Cuarteles de invierno by Osvaldo Soriano)
1986: Das Schweigen des Dichters (screenplay: Peter Lilienthal — Based on The Continuing Silence of a Poet by A. B. Yehoshua)
1988: Der Radfahrer von San Cristóbal (screenplay: Antonio Skármeta, Peter Lilienthal)
1995: Wasserman – Der singende Hund (screenplay: Peter Lilienthal — Based on a story by Yoram Kaniuk)
1995: Angesichts der Wälder (screenplay: Peter Lilienthal — Based on a story by A. B. Yehoshua)
Documentaries
1959: Im Handumdrehen verdient
1964: Marl – Das Porträt einer Stadt
1969: 
1970: Ich, Montag – Ich, Dienstag – Ich, Mittwoch – Ich, Donnerstag. Portrait Gombrowicz
1971: Start Nr. 9
1972: Shirley Chisholm for President
1977: Kadir
2001: : Ein Fremder
2007: Camilo: The Long Road to Disobedience

Actor
1972: Dead Pigeon on Beethoven Street – Carlos
1977: The American Friend – Marcangelo
1978: I See This Land from Afar – Pfarrer Hendrich
1979: 
1983: Der Platzanweiser – Porträt eines Kinomanen

References

External links

1929 births
Living people
Mass media people from Berlin
German male film actors
Male actors from Berlin
Members of the Academy of Arts, Berlin
Best Director German Film Award winners
Directors of Golden Bear winners